A number of institutions are called Zeppelin Museum:

Germany
 Zeppelin Museum Friedrichshafen, a museum in on Lake Constance in Germany, housing the world's largest aviation collection and chronicling the history of the Zeppelin airships.
 Zeppelin-Museum Meersburg, Meersburg, with parts, inventory, uniforms and models
 Albert-Sammt-Zeppelin-Museum, Niederstetten, Main-Tauber district, Baden-Württemberg, named in memory of last airship captain Albert Sammt
 Zeppelin Museum Zeppelinheim, Neu-Isenburg near Frankfurt am Main, with a museum building resembling  a quarter section of the hull of the LZ 10 
 Zeppelin hangars in the Aeronauticum museum in Nordholz

Denmark
 Zeppelin and Garrison Museum, Tønder, Southern Denmark